NGC 7056 is a barred spiral galaxy located about 225 million light-years away in the constellation of Pegasus. NGC 7056 was discovered by astronomer Albert Marth on September 17, 1863. It was then rediscovered by astronomer Truman Henry Safford on September 29, 1866.

See also 
 NGC 7051

References

External links 

Barred spiral galaxies
Pegasus (constellation)
IC objects
7056
11734
66641
Astronomical objects discovered in 1863
Discoveries by Albert Marth